Blues Anytime: An Anthology of British Blues is a series of compilation albums featuring tracks from various British blues artists. Three volumes were released by Immediate Records in 1968, followed by Blues Leftovers in 1969.

The albums feature various tracks from such artists as John Mayall, Tony McPhee, Savoy Brown Blues Band, Jo Ann Kelly, Jeremy Spencer, Cyril Davies, Stuff Smith, Albert Lee, Dave Kelly and Rod Stewart and were also the first release of several exclusive tracks recorded for Immediate between 1965 and '67. These include recordings by Jimmy Page with Jeff Beck, Nicky Hopkins and the All-Stars, plus seven instrumentals recorded by Page and Eric Clapton, backed by members of The Rolling Stones (Bill Wyman, bass, Mick Jagger, harmonica and Ian Stewart, keyboard) and the only recorded output by Santa Barbara Machine Head.

Reissues
When Immediate initially released the original Blues Anytime albums in the USA, the first two volumes were simply titled An Anthology of British Blues, with the third volume renamed as The Beginning: British Blues.

The Blues Anytime tracks were released again by Immediate in 1969 as two double albums titled Anthology of British Blues, albeit presented in a different running order. The first was made up of Vol. 1 side A, Leftovers side A, Vol. 3 side A and Vol. 2 side B, with the second being Vol. 1 side B, Leftovers side B, Vol. 2 side A and Vol. 3 side B.

In 1970, after the dissolution of Immediate Records, RCA Victor reissued the original Blues Anytime albums under the name British Archive Series: Blues for Collectors Vol. 1–4,. A compilation of tracks from this series was released  by RCA as Eric Clapton, Jeff Beck, Jimmy Page: Guitar Boogie (1971)

In 1986, Line Records in Germany released the complete four-album-series as  box set

1986's White Boy Blues, Volumes 1 and 2 (Castle Communications), is largely made up of Blues Anytime.

In 1996, Charly Records released a 3CD box set titled The Immediate Blues Anthology; the first two discs covering the tracks from Blues Anytime Vol. 1, Vol. 2, Vol. 3 and Leftovers presented in their original running order, with the third disc made up of other assorted tracks from the Immediate archives.

The original series was reissued again in 2006 by JVC in Japan, released across two CDs presented in mini LP sleeve replicas with obi strips. The first, titled Blues Anytime I, combined the tracks from the original Blues Anytime Vol.1 and Vol. 2, using the original British artwork from Vol. 1 as its cover art. The second, Blues Anytime II, combined the tracks from the original Blues Anytime Vol. 3 and Blues Leftovers, but used the original American cover art from Vol. 1 on the front and the cover from Leftovers on the back.

Track listings

Blues Anytime Vol. 1

Blues Anytime Vol. 2

Blues Anytime Vol. 3

Blues Leftovers

References

External links
http://music.geocities.jp/d2cd03/bluesanytime.html reproduction of liner notes

Immediate Records compilation albums
Regional music compilation albums
Blues compilation albums
1968 compilation albums
1969 compilation albums
Albums produced by Mike Vernon (record producer)
Compilation album series